The NERV (natural endogenous respiration vessel) is a specialised bioreactor, designed to operate under high and varying load and flow conditions.

Description
The NERV system allows the bacteria cultures within the reactor to be controlled both by type and volume. Fresh bacteria are bred and cultured outside of the reactor; regular dosing ensures that a constant supply of fresh bacteria is always on hand, even during periods of low nutrient values or high toxicity. This ensures that cultures are not 'wiped out' and that immediate recovery of bio-remediation takes place.
 
NERV is more compact than traditional technology and during times of low nutrient levels the bacteria enter the state of endogenous respiration, a situation where they eat their own biomass. This results in dramatically lower sludge production compared with traditional biological systems. This technology benefits from a much smaller footprint than traditional systems and the concept of breeding bacteria outside of the unit removes the reliance on self-generating bacteria within the system giving it the ability to absorb toxic shocks and extreme nutrient variations.

Use
A typical NERV installation would be a cooked meat production plant with regularly washed down ovens.  The effluent from such a factory would be very high in FOG (fats, oils and grease) but would frequently contain cleaning fluids and biocides.  The bacteria in a traditional treatment system would be killed by this kind of shock, rendering the systems useless.  Some food plants alternate their wash downs to be acidic and basic to avoid build up of resistant organisms, a properly set-up NERV reactor can deal with this variation.

External links 
Details of original Patent

Waste management
Environmental engineering